Ofer Grosskopf (born 12 October 1969) is an Israeli judge and former law professor who currently serves as a judge on the Supreme Court of Israel. He is the youngest judge in the court, and expected to be its President in 2035-2039.

Early life and education
Grosskopf was born in Israel in 1969 to Yossi and Ayala Grosskopf, and grew up in Herzliya. His father was a computer project manager and his mother was a laboratory technician at the Tel Aviv University School of Dental Research. He has a younger sister, Yael.

In 1988, he joined the Atuda program, deferring his mandatory military service to study law and economics at Tel Aviv University. He completed a BA in economics in 1990, an LLB in 1991, and an MA in economics in 1992. He subsequently earned an LLM from Harvard Law School and an SJD with distinction from Tel Aviv University in 1999.

Legal career
From 1991 to 1997, Grosskopf served as an officer in the Israel Defense Forces, first as a legal adviser in the Military Advocate General's Office, then as a legal counsel to the military's housing projects. After completing his doctorate at Tel Aviv University under the direction of Professor Daniel Friedmann in 1999, Grosskopf worked as a research assistant to Friedmann.

Although Grosskopf's law career did not involve engaging in litigation, he represented his father in a lawsuit against Bituah Leumi in 1999.

Grosskopf was a member of the Faculty of Law at the College of Management Academic Studies in 1996, and was appointed a Senior Lecturer in 2001. In 2002, he joined the Faculty of Law at Tel Aviv University, where he served as a Senior Lecturer from 2002 to 2006, then as an Associate Professor from 2006 to 2009 and Vice Dean from 2008 to 2009.

In 2009, he was appointed a judge on the Lod District Court. In 2018, he was appointed to serve on the Supreme Court. He assumed office upon the retirement of judge Yoram Danziger.

Personal life
Grosskopf is married to Batya and has four sons. He lives in Kfar Saba.

References

1969 births
Living people
Judges of the Supreme Court of Israel
Tel Aviv University alumni
Harvard Law School alumni